Central Scientific Company was founded in 1900 in downtown Chicago. It was formed out of what was left of the Olmstad Scientific Company.
  
Central Scientific manufactured and distributed science teaching equipment for schools, colleges, and universities by catalog mail order. The trademark CENCO was used from 1909 onwards. CENCO dominated the field of selling science education equipment through their mail order catalog.
  
By 1935, the company established itself as one of the leading national suppliers of science equipment. During World War II, part of the manufacturing facility was turned over to the production of war necessities, making bombsights for airplanes and fuses for large bombs.

After 1968, the company began having financial difficulties. In 1974, the assets were sold off to competitors. The educational business retained the name Central Scientific Company.
  
In April 1979, Central Scientific's assets and activities were acquired by two businessmen from Buffalo, New York. They sold the business to Sargent-Welch (their main competitor) in 2000.

See also
VWR International

External links
http://www.humboldt.edu/scimus/Manufac/Cenco/Cenco.htm
http://www.scripophily.net/cenin.html
Smithsonian history
Instruments from the Central Scientific Company at Greek Schools
Entire 1912 catalog K of Physical Apparatus for Universities and Colleges has been digitized (all images freely available for download in a variety of formats from Science History Institute Digital Collections at digital.sciencehistory.org.

1900 establishments in Illinois
2000 disestablishments in Illinois
Manufacturing companies established in 1900
Manufacturing companies disestablished in 2000
Defunct companies based in Chicago
Science education in the United States